The 34th National Film Awards, presented by Ministry of Information, Bangladesh to felicitate the best of Bangladeshi Cinema released in the year 2009. The government announced the names of 28 artistes in 26 categories for the National Film Award in recognition of their outstanding contributions to the country's film industry. Prime Minister Sheikh Hasina gave away the awards to the artistes. From this year, Government decided to give lifetime achievement award and Sultana Zaman was the first recipient of the award.

List of winners
A Total of 28 awards in 26 categories were given in this year.

Merit awards

Merit Awards

Special Awards

Event
The whole ceremony was divided into three segment. First, speech of the guests, second award giving and third, cultural program. First two segment were anchored by Dewan Saidur and Shamim Khan. Cultural segment was anchored by Riaz and Shomi Kaiser. In this segment, folk singer Momtaz, Kumar Biswajit, Shakila Zafar and Ankhi Alamgir sang songs for the audience. Shakib Khan-Apu Biswas, Ferdous Ahmed-Moushumi, Mamnun Hasan Emon-Shaina Amin, and Nirob-Sharika performed in the Dhallywood soundtrack. A.T.M. Shamsuzzaman performed in a single act drama. Artists of Bangladesh Shilpakola Academy had two dance performance that night.

See also
Bachsas Film Awards
Meril Prothom Alo Awards
Ifad Film Club Award
Babisas Award

References

External links

National Film Awards (Bangladesh) ceremonies
2009 film awards
2011 awards in Bangladesh
2011 in Dhaka
July 2011 events in Bangladesh